Nanshan was a county-controlled district in the province of Hebei, China. It was under the administration of Zhuolu County, Zhangjiakou. It was the last county-controlled district as of 2019. It has been replaced and consequently removed from the divisions in 2020.

References 

Former districts of China
Zhuolu County
Township-level divisions of Hebei